The 6th Annual Tranny Awards was a pornographic awards event recognizing the best in transgender pornography form the previous year from November 1, 2011 to 31 October 2012. the nominees were announced on November 14, 2013, online on the trannyawards.com website. The winners were announced during the awards on February 16, 2014. There were a total of 22 Award categories.

The awards were the best attended of the Tranny awards held up to that point, with 800 attendees. Founder of the awards Steven Grooby stated: “The Tranny Awards started as a joke, now it’s a nice event.”

Winners and nominees
The nominations for the 6th Tranny Awards were announced online and opened to fan voting on December 21, 2012, online on the trannyawards.com website. The winners were announced during the awards on February 16, 2014.

Awards
Winners are listed first, highlighted in boldface.

References

Transgender Erotica Awards
Pornographic film awards
21st-century awards
American pornographic film awards
Annual events in the United States
Awards established in 2008
Culture of Los Angeles
Adult industry awards